This is a list of military equipment used in the Korean War.

Vehicles
 Alvis Saladin
 Landing Vehicle Tracked 
 Dodge M37
 GAZ-67
 M39 Armored Utility Vehicle
M20 Armored Utility Vehicle 
 Morris C8
 Willys M38
 BTR-40 APC
 M8 Armored Car
 BA-64 Armored Car
 M19 MGMC
 M15A1 Halftrack
 M16 MGMC
 M5HST Prime Mover
 LVT 3C Amphibious APC

Tanks
 M24 Chaffee
 Cromwell tank
 Iosif Stalin tank
 M26 Pershing
 Centurion tank
 Churchill tank
 M4 Sherman
 M46 Patton (US)
 T-34/85
 LVT A5 Amphibious Tank
 M4A3R3 Sherman Flame Tank
 M4A3 Bulldozer Tank

Artillery
 M3 Howitzer
 Ordnance QF 17-pounder (Aus.)
 100 mm air defense gun KS-19
 122 mm gun M1931/37 (A-19)
 122 mm howitzer M1938 (M-30)
 152 mm howitzer-gun M1937 (ML-20)
 155 mm Long Tom
 37 mm automatic air defense gun M1939 (61-K)
 76 mm regimental gun M1943
 85 mm air defense gun M1939 (52-K)
 90 mm Gun M1/M2/M3
 BL 5.5 inch Medium Gun
 ISU-152
 Katyusha rocket launcher
 M101 howitzer
 M114 155 mm howitzer
 M115 howitzer
 M36 tank destroyer
 M40 Gun Motor Carriage
 M44 Self Propelled Howitzer
 M7 Priest
 Ordnance QF 25 pounder
 SU-100
 SU-76
 ZPU
 76.2mm Gun
 45mm AT Gun
 57mm AT Gun

Weapons
 ASM-A-1 Tarzon
 Napalm
 Ram (rocket)

Mortars
 120-PM-43 mortar
 2-inch mortar
 82-BM-37
 82-PM-41
 M1 mortar
 M1938 mortar
 M2 4.2 inch mortar
 M2 mortar
 M30 mortar
 Ordnance ML 3 inch Mortar
 Ordnance ML 4.2 inch Mortar
 RM-38

Infantry weapons
 Bazooka 
 Enfield No. 2 Mk I revolver 
 Lee–Enfield 
 M1911 pistol 
 M2 flamethrower 
 Mills bomb No. 36M 
 Owen Gun 
 Sten 
 Stokes mortar 
 Thompson submachine gun 
 Vickers machine gun 
 Webley Mk IV revolver 
 Bren light machine gun 
 Browning Hi-Power
 Chiang Kai-shek rifle
 Degtyaryov machine gun
 DShK
 F1 grenade (Russia)
 FN Model 1949 (Belgian)
 Hanyang 88
 Lewis Gun
 M1 bayonet
 M1 carbine
 M1 Garand
 M18 recoilless rifle
 M1903 Springfield
 M1917 Browning machine gun
 M1917 Enfield
 M1918 Browning Automatic Rifle
 M1919 Browning machine gun
 M2 Browning
 M2 mortar
 M20 recoilless rifle
 M3 submachine gun
 M30 mortar
 M7 grenade launcher
 Madsen M-50 (Thai)
 Mauser C96
 MG 08
 MG 34
 Mills bomb
 Mk 2 grenade
 Model 24 grenade
 Mosin–Nagant
 Nagant M1895
 PM M1910
 PPS submachine gun
 PPSh-41
 PTRD
 RGD-33 grenade
 SG-43 Goryunov
 infrared Sniperscope
 SKS
 Sterling submachine gun
 TT pistol
 Type 99 rifle
 Webley Revolver
 Winchester Model 1897
 Winchester Model 1912
 ZB vz. 26

Military aircraft
 Antonov An-2
 List of surviving Boeing B-29 Superfortresses
 Beechcraft L-23 Seminole
 Bell H-13 Sioux
 Boeing B-17 Flying Fortress
 Boeing B-29 Superfortress
 Boeing C-97 Stratofreighter
 Douglas C-124 Globemaster II
 Consolidated PB4Y-2 Privateer
 Curtiss C-46 Commando
 Douglas A-1 Skyraider
 Douglas A-26 Invader
 Douglas C-47 Skytrain
 Douglas C-54 Skymaster
 List of Douglas DC-4 operators
 List of Douglas DC-4 variants
 McDonnell F2H Banshee
 Vought F4U Corsair
 Fairchild C-119 Flying Boxcar
 Fairey Firefly
 Gloster Meteor
 Grumman F7F Tigercat
 Grumman F9F Panther
 Hawker Sea Fury
 Hiller OH-23 Raven
 Ilyushin Il-10
 Ilyushin Il-28
 Lavochkin La-11
 Lavochkin La-7
 Lavochkin La-9
 List of Sabre and Fury units in US military
 List of surviving Douglas A-26 Invaders
 Lisunov Li-2
 Lockheed F-94 Starfire
 Lockheed P-2 Neptune
 Lockheed P-80 Shooting Star
 Mikoyan-Gurevich MiG-15
 North American F-82 Twin Mustang
 North American F-86 Sabre
 North American F-86D Sabre
 North American T-6 Texan
 North American T-6 Texan variants
 North American P-51 Mustang
 North American P-51 variants
 Polikarpov Po-2
 Republic F-84 Thunderjet
 Sikorsky H-19
 Sikorsky H-5
 Supermarine Seafire
 Tupolev Tu-2
 Westland Dragonfly
 Yakovlev Mig-21s
 Yakovlev Yak-11
 Yakovlev Yak-18
 Yakovlev Yak-9

Military equipment
 Ultrasonic AN/MPQ-14 Course Directing Central (US)

Radio equipment
 AN/PRC-6 hand held walkie-talkie radio
 AN/PRC-10 portable man-pack radio transceiver

Military uniform
 American fiber helmet

See also
 Korean War
 United States Air Force In South Korea  
 USAF units and aircraft of the Korean War 
 List of Korean War weapons

References

Korean War
Military equipment
Korean War